Shelf Road may refer to:

 Shelf Road in Fourmile Canyon (Fremont County, Colorado)
 Shelf Road in the Ojai Valley (Ventura County, California)